Bohne is a North German variant of the German language occupational surname Bohn for a grower of beans. Notable people with the name include:

 Gotthold Bohne (1890–1957), German law professor
 Hermann Bohne (1890–1949), Norwegian gymnast
 Louis Bohne (died 1821), sales agent for Veuve Clicquot
 Nikki Bohne (1987), American singer, stage actress, and dancer
 Sam Bohne (1896–1977), professional Major League Baseball player
 Walter Bohne (1903–1944), German communist
 Werner Bohne (1895–1940), German cinematographer

References 

German-language surnames
Occupational surnames